Nicholas Muse (born November 25, 1998) is an American football tight end for the Minnesota Vikings of the National Football League (NFL). He played college football at William & Mary before transferring to South Carolina.

Early life and high school
Muse grew up in Belmont, North Carolina, and attended South Point High School.

College career
Muse began his college career at William & Mary. As a freshman, he caught four passes for 55 yards and one touchdown. Muse was named third-team All-Colonial Athletic Association as a sophomore after finishing the season with 30 receptions for 453 yards and one touchdown. After the season, he transferred to South Carolina.

Muse caught 17 passes for 158 yards in his first season with the Gamecocks. As a senior, he had 30 receptions for 425 yards and one touchdown. Muse decided to utilize the extra year of eligibility granted to college athletes who played in the 2020 season due to the coronavirus pandemic and return to South Carolina for a third season. He caught 20 passes for 222 yards with two touchdowns in his final season.

Professional career

Minnesota Vikings
Muse was drafted by the Minnesota Vikings with the 227th overall pick in the seventh round of the 2022 NFL Draft. He was waived on August 30, 2022, and re-signed to the practice squad one day later. Muse was signed to the 53-man roster on November 19, 2022. He was waived on January 6, 2023, and re-signed to the practice squad. He signed a reserve/future contract on January 16, 2023.

Personal life
Muse's older brother, Tanner Muse, played college football at Clemson and currently plays for the Seattle Seahawks.

References

External links
 Minnesota Vikings bio
William & Mary Tribe bio
South Carolina Gamecocks bio

1998 births
Living people
American football tight ends
South Carolina Gamecocks football players
Minnesota Vikings players
William & Mary Tribe football players
Players of American football from North Carolina
People from Belmont, North Carolina